Adam Sulzdorf-Liszkiewicz is an American designer and educator, who teaches at Michigan State University. He has designed both virtual reality and serious games.

History
Sulzdorf-Liszkiewicz received an MFA from SUNY Buffalo and a PhD from the USC Interactive Media & Games Division. He has taught game design and theory at the University of California, Los Angeles.  As a student, he developed a theory around popular games, specifically FarmVille, as a cultural phenomenon.

Theory of Virtual Reality
Sulzdorf-Liszkiewicz has been credited with connecting Absurdism with virtual reality (VR) as an extension of ongoing philosophy of how humans imagine themselves in VR environments. He has cited the absurdist Fluxus art movement as a point of entry for this theory. In these same conversations, he has described the importance of so-called Relational Aesthetics in VR, where human-to-human relationships outside the VR headset are important to establishing any experience.

Sulzdorf-Liszkiewicz designed the VR game Hot Dogs, Horseshoes & Hand Grenades, which was released in 2017.

Notes

External links
 RUST LTD
 afeeld

Year of birth missing (living people)
Living people
American video game designers
Occidental College faculty
University at Buffalo alumni
University of California, Los Angeles faculty
USC Interactive Media & Games Division alumni